The fast-food restaurant chain McDonald's was founded in 1940 and has since grown to the world's largest restaurant chain by revenue.

Before 1940s 

The McDonald family moved from Manchester, New Hampshire to Hollywood, California in the late 1930s, where brothers Richard and Maurice McDonald ("Dick" and "Mac") began working as set movers and handymen at motion-picture studios. In 1937, their father Patrick McDonald opened The Airdrome, a food stand, on Huntington Drive (Route 66) near the Monrovia Airport in the Los Angeles County city of Monrovia.

1940s 
In October 1948, the McDonald brothers realized that most of their profits derived from the sale of hamburgers. They shuttered their successful carhop drive-in to establish a streamlined system with a simple menu that consisted of only hamburgers, cheeseburgers, potato chips, coffee, soft drinks and apple pie.

1950s 
In April 1952, the brothers decided that they needed an entirely new building to achieve two goals: further efficiency improvements and a more eye-catching appearance. They collected recommendations for an architect and interviewed at least four, choosing Stanley Clark Meston, who practiced in nearby Fontana. The brothers and Meston worked together closely in the design of the new building. They achieved the extra efficiencies that they needed by, among other things, drawing the actual measurements of every piece of equipment in chalk on a tennis court behind the McDonald house (with Meston's assistant, Charles Fish). 

The new design achieved a great deal of notice for its gleaming surfaces of red and white ceramic tile, stainless steel, brightly colored sheet metal and glass; pulsing red, white, yellow and green neon; and two 25-foot yellow sheet-metal arches trimmed in neon, which they named the "Golden Arches" at the design stage. A third, smaller arch sign at the roadside depicted a pudgy character in a chef's hat known as Speedee striding across the top, trimmed in animated neon. The brothers implemented several techniques to encourage customers to eat quickly and not to linger in the restaurant, such as reduced heating in the dining area, fixed and angled seating to place customers directly over their food, distance between seats to reduce socialization and cone-shaped cups, which would force customers to hold their drinks while eating.

In late 1953, with only a rendering of Meston's design in hand, the brothers began seeking franchisees. Their first was Neil Fox, a distributor for General Petroleum Corporation. Fox's stand, the first with Meston's golden arches design, opened in May 1953 at Central Avenue and Indian School Road in Phoenix, Arizona. Their second franchisee was the team of Fox's brother-in-law Roger Williams and Burdette "Bud" Landon, both of whom also worked for General Petroleum. Williams and Landon opened their stand on August 18, 1953 at 10207 Lakewood Boulevard in Downey, California. The Downey stand is the oldest surviving McDonald's restaurant.

Ray Kroc joins and expands franchise operation 
In 1954, Ray Kroc, a seller of Prince Castle brand Multimixer milkshake machines, learned that the McDonald brothers were using eight of his machines at their San Bernardino restaurant. His curiosity was piqued, and he visited the restaurant with his friend Charles Lewis, who had suggested to Kroc several improvements to the McDonald's burger recipe. The McDonald brothers operated six franchise locations.

Believing that the McDonald's formula was a ticket to success, Kroc suggested that the brothers franchise their restaurants throughout the United States. The brothers were skeptical that the self-service approach could succeed in colder, rainier climates; furthermore, their thriving business in San Bernardino, and franchises already operating or planned, made them reluctant to risk a national venture. Kroc offered to assume the major responsibility for establishing the new franchises elsewhere. He returned to his home outside of Chicago with rights to set up McDonald's restaurants throughout the country, except in a handful of territories in California and Arizona already licensed by the McDonald brothers. The brothers were to receive 0.5% of gross sales.

Sonneborn model and shift to real-estate holdings 
In 1956, Ray Kroc met Harry J. Sonneborn, a former vice president of finance for Tastee-Freez, who offered an idea to accelerate the growth and investment grade of Kroc's planned McDonald's operation: to own the real estate upon which future franchises would be built. Kroc hired Sonneborn and his plan was executed by forming a separate company, Franchise Realty Corp, to hold McDonald's real estate. The new company signed leases and procured mortgages for both land and buildings, passing these costs on to the franchisee with a 20-40% markup and a reduced initial deposit of $950. The "Sonneborn model" of real-estate ownership within the franchise persists to this day, and may be the most important financial decision in the company's history. McDonald's present-day real-estate holdings represent $37.7 billion on its balance sheet, about 99% of the company's assets and 35% of its annual gross revenue.

1960s 

By 1960, McDonald's restaurants were grossing $56 million annually. The growth in U.S. automobile use that came with suburbanization and the interstate highway system contributed heavily to McDonald's success. In 1961, Kroc's conflict over the vision of the company with the founding brothers had escalated, and he asked them how much money they wanted to leave their business to him entirely. The brothers asked for $2.7 million ($23.4 million in 2021 dollars), which Kroc did not have. Harry J. Sonneborn was able to raise the money for him, and Kroc bought the founding brothers' interests in the company. This purchase laid the groundwork for positioning the company for an IPO and making McDonald's the top fast-food chain in the country. The exact process by which the company was sold is not known; it is depicted as a hostile takeover by Kroc in the 2016 biographical film The Founder, but that portrayal has been disputed, and interviews from the time suggest a more voluntary transition.

Kroc and Sonneborn disagreed over expansion of the company, leading to Sonneborn's resignation in 1967. Kroc took over the title of CEO and president.

McDonald's success in the 1960s was largely the result of the company's skillful marketing and flexible response to customer demand. In 1962, the Filet-O-Fish sandwich, billed as "the fish that catches people," was introduced. In 1967, the Big Mac was created by Jim Delligatti, whose franchised McDonald's was in Uniontown, Pennsylvania, and was added to McDonald's national menu the next year.

1970s 

There was some skepticism about the company's phenomenal growth internationally. When Wally and Hugh Morris approached the corporation in 1974 to bring McDonald's into New Zealand, they were firmly shunned by Kroc who, citing a visit to the country, stated, "There aren't any people... I never met a more dead-than-alive hole in my life." The Morris brothers were finally granted a franchise in May 1975. They negotiated a deal with the corporation by selling New Zealand cheese to the U.S. to offset the high costs of importing plant equipment. The first New Zealand restaurant opened in June 1976 at Porirua, near Wellington, to much more success than the corporation had predicted.

1980s 
On October 29, 1983, the first McDonald's restaurant in Mexico opened in Pedegral, Mexico City.

On July 18, 1984, the San Ysidro McDonald's massacre took place when James Huberty opened fire inside a McDonald's in that town, killing 21 people and injuring 19. Huberty was killed by a SWAT team sharpshooter.

1990s 
The first McDonald's Express locations opened in 1991. These are smaller-scale prototypes, usually constructed in prefabricated buildings or urban storefronts, that do not feature certain menu items such as milkshakes and Quarter Pounders.

The first McDonald's in Mainland China opened in Dongmen, Shenzhen in October 1990. 

The Extra Value Meal, a burger, fries and drink combination deal, was introduced from 1993, originally as part of a Jurassic Park tie-in.

On April 28 and 29, 1992, the Taiwan McDonald's bombings occurred when bombs were planted in or near various McDonald's restaurants in Taiwan as part of an extortion attempt, causing the death of a policeman and injuries to four civilians, including two young children, and the temporary closure of all 57 McDonald's locations in that country.

A week later on May 7, Sydney River McDonald's murders took place in Sydney River, Nova Scotia, Canada when a botched robbery committed by employee Derek Wood and two accomplices resulted in the murder of three employees, and the permanent disablement of a fourth employee shot in the head.

In 1997, the first McDonald's outlet in Bolivia was opened in Santa Cruz de la Sierra who in November 2002, McDonald's left Bolivia.

2000s 
In 2000, a McDonald's in Dearborn, Michigan in Greater Detroit was the first one in Michigan and the only one east of the Mississippi River to offer halal food for Muslim customers.

2010s 
In January 2012, the company announced that revenue for 2011 reached an all-time high of $27 billion, and that 2,400 restaurants would be updated and 1,300 new ones opened worldwide.

In the middle of the decade, the restaurant began to suffer from declining profits. In response, McDonald's began to offer a limited selection of its breakfast menu all day starting in 2015. At first, the launch was unpopular with franchisees who claimed that the changes caused service to slow down. However, the plan paid off with CNBC reporting that the company's fourth quarter earnings "easily topped analysts' forecasts".

On July 22, 2016 the 2016 Munich shooting took place when David Sonboly, an 18-year-old German-Iranian whom police said held "radical right-wing and racist views", opened fire at a McDonald's restaurant known to be frequented by immigrants, before shooting at bystanders in the street outside and then in Olympia shopping mall, and then killing himself. Nine people were killed, and 16 more injured.

2020s 
On March 8, 2022, McDonald's suspended operations at all 850 of its locations in Russia, in response to the Russian invasion of Ukraine twelve days prior. The move comes after similar decisions by other Western companies and pressure from critics.  The brand relaunched on June 12, 2022 as 'Vkusno & tochka' (Вкусно и точка, Tasty and that's it) by local franchisee Alexander Govor.

Timeline

Before 1940s 
 1937: Patrick McDonald opens a food and drinks stand called "The Airdrome" on historic Route 66 (now Huntington Drive) near the Monrovia Airport in Monrovia, California.

1940s 
 1940: Brothers Richard and Maurice McDonald move The Airdrome building 40 miles (64 km) east to San Bernardino, California, where they open the first McDonald's restaurant, near U.S. Route 66, at West 14th St and 1398 North E St., on May 15. Its menu consisted of 25 items, mostly barbecue. As was common at the time, they employed around 20 carhops. It became a popular and highly profitable teen hangout.
 1948: After noticing that almost all of their profits came from hamburgers, the brothers closed the restaurant for several months to remodel it and implement their innovative "Speedee Service System", a streamlined assembly line for hamburgers. The carhops are fired, and when the restaurant reopens it sells only hamburgers, milkshakes, and french fries. At 15 cents, the burgers are about half as expensive as at standard diners, and they are served immediately. The restaurant is extremely successful, and its fame spreads by word of mouth.

1950s 

 1953: The third McDonald's restaurant, franchised to Roger Williams and Burdette Landon, opens in Downey, California at the corner of Lakewood Blvd and Florence Avenue. Today it is the oldest McDonald's restaurant still in operation.
 1957: The original restaurant in San Bernardino is rebuilt with a golden arches design.

1960s 
 1962: Market research shows that people identify McDonald's primarily with the golden arches.
 1967: The First McDonald's outside the United States opens in Richmond BC Canada.

1970s 
 1971: The first McDonald's in Europe opens in Zaandam, the Netherlands in collaboration with Dutch supermarket chain Albert Heijn.
 1971: The first McDonald's in the Southern Hemisphere opens in Australia, in the Sydney suburb of Yagoona in December. The restaurant becomes known locally as "Maccas".
 1972: The McDonald's system generates $1 billion in sales through 2200 restaurants.
 1972: The first McDonald's in New York City opens on Manhattan's Upper West Side, dubbed "Townhouse" (to reflect that it was not a drive-in) and serves a record 100,000 hamburgers in its first week.

 1974: On November 13, the first McDonald's in the United Kingdom opens in Woolwich, south-east London. It is the 3000th McDonald's restaurant.
 1976: The first McDonald's in Switzerland, on Rue du Mont-Blanc in Geneva.

1980s 

 1984: On July 18, James Oliver Huberty opens fire inside a McDonald's in San Ysidro, near the US Mexican border, where 21 customers were killed including Huberty.
 1984: The first McDonald's in Finland opens in Tampere.
 1987: On August 12, a Piper Cheyenne, which started in Augsburg, West Germany, was on a simulated approach to Munich's main airport Riem, when all instruments failed. The plane crashed into the McDonald's restaurant in the Wasserburger Landstrasse. Fourteen people were killed in the incident: 4 in the plane, 3 on the street or in a bus, which was also struck by the plane, and 7 in the restaurant. The McDonald's in the Wasserburger Landstrasse has since been rebuilt.
 1987: On 23 November, The first Scottish store opens in Dundee, followed by Kirkcaldy.
 1988: On 29 April, McDonald's opens its first restaurant in Hungary, in Budapest, which is the first McDonald's in a Warsaw Pact country, behind the Iron Curtain.

1990s 

 1990: On January 31, the first McDonald's restaurant opens in the Soviet Union, in Moscow. Located in Pushkinskaya Square, it serves 30,000 people on opening day, and is the largest McDonald's in the world at the time.
 1990: In November, McDonald's opens its first restaurant in Chile.
 1992: A McDonald's employee and two others open fire, killing and injuring a number of people in the Sydney River McDonald's murders in Nova Scotia, Canada.
 1995: The first McDonald's in Estonia opens in Tallinn.
 1995: The first McDonald's in Malta opens in Valletta.

2000s 
 2002: In October, McDonald's opens the first of two corporate stores in Lincoln, Nebraska to test concept restaurant called "3N1". The concept incorporated a "Sandwich & Platter" casual dining area, a "bakery and ice cream" area featuring gourmet coffees, and a traditional McDonald's into one building. The second store is launched approximately six months later. The concept is spearheaded by Tom Ryan, who was Executive Vice President and Chief Concept Officer at the time. The concept is abandoned in less than a year, and Ryan leaves McDonald's to join Quiznos Sub.
 2003: James Richard Cantalupo is elected chairman and chief operating officer, succeeding Jack M. Greenberg. Just prior to assuming his post Cantalupo shuts down Project Innovate, a global consulting project that had already spent $170 million of a projected 5-year budget of $1.2 billion.
 2003: According to Technomic, a market research firm, McDonald's share of the U.S. market had fallen three percentage points in five years and was at 15.2%.
 2003: The firm reports a $126M USD loss for the fourth quarter.
 2004: Chairman and CEO Jim Cantalupo dies suddenly at the age of 60 in his hotel room of an apparent heart attack while attending the annual franchisee convention in Orlando, FL on April 19. A 30-year veteran of the organization, Cantalupo had previously served as president and CEO of McDonald's International. He is credited with introducing the premium salad line and reformulating Chicken McNuggets to include leaner, all-white meat. Andrew J. McKenna Sr., a prominent Chicago businessman and a McDonald's director, is elected Nonexecutive Chairman. Charlie Bell of Sydney, Australia, is elected president and CEO of McDonald's Corporation. A month later Bell is diagnosed with colorectal cancer during a physical exam required for his new post and dies in January 2005. Like retired chairman and former CEO Fred L. Turner, Bell began his McDonald's career as a crew member. He was promoted frequently, serving as the corporation's Chief Operating Officer and as President of both McDonald's Europe and of the Asia/Pacific, Middle East and Africa Group.
 2005: Jim Skinner is elected president and CEO. Skinner began his McDonald's career as a trainee restaurant manager at a McDonald's in Carpentersville, Illinois in 1971 after serving nearly ten years with the US Navy.
 2005: A fired employee with Asperger's Syndrome, who was terminated for hitting a customer, murders his former manager at a McDonald's outlet in West Sussex, England. Shane Freer (20) stabbed Jackie Marshall (57) to death during a children's party at the fast food restaurant she was supervising. Freer was convicted and sentenced to life in prison by Lewes Crown Court.

2010s 

 2010: Subway surpasses McDonald's as the largest single-brand restaurant chain and the largest restaurant operator globally.
 2011: McDonald's makes a deal with the Marine Stewardship Council to certify the fish used for the Filet-O-Fish sold in Europe.
 2012: McDonald's begins posting the calories count for items on the menus and menu boards in the drive-thru.
 2013: First McDonald's burger restaurant franchise in Vietnam was awarded to the son in law of the Vietnamese prime minister.
 2013: McDonald's Australia trials home delivery in selected areas of Sydney, with online ordering available through Menulog
 2014: (October) McDonald's Australia trials custom made burgers with the choice of buns, cheese, sauces, etc. This was launched at the Castle Hill Store in Sydney.
 2015: United States stores implement all-day breakfast.
 2016: McDonald's withdraws the Step-It activity tracker, which is worn on the wrist, and was given away with Happy Meals to children in the US and Canada. There were fears that the devices caused skin irritation.
 2018: McDonald's announces that it will ban plastic drinking straws in its UK and Ireland restaurants.
 2019: McDonald's purchases personalization-technology company Dynamic Yield for $300 million and acquires a 9.9% stake in mobile software company Plexure for $3.7 million.
 2019: McDonald's opens the McHive, the world's smallest restaurant for bees.
 2019: On September 10, McDonald's acquired Apprente, an American startup company specializing in customer service utilizing artificial intelligence.

2020s 
 2020: In March, McDonald's halts all day breakfast due to the COVID-19 pandemic.
 2022: On March 8, the company announces that it is pausing operations at all 850 of its locations in Russia, in response to the Russian invasion of Ukraine twelve days prior. The move comes after similar decisions by other Western companies and pressure from critics.

References

 
McDonald's